Neo-Baroque  may refer to:

Neo-Baroque music
Neo-Baroque painting
Baroque Revival architecture
Neo-Baroque film